The first personal computer fax board, GammaFax, was produced in 1985 by GammaLink.

Footnotes

Telecommunications equipment
Computing output devices